The women's snowboard halfpipe competition of the FIS Freestyle Ski and Snowboarding World Championships 2015 was held at Kreischberg, Austria on January 16 (qualifying)  and January 17 (finals). 
41 athletes from 15 countries competed.

Qualification
The following are the results of the qualification.

Elimination round
The following are the results of the elimination round.

1/8 Finals

The top 32 qualifiers advanced to the 1/8 finals. From here, they participated in four-person elimination races, with the top two from each race advancing. 

Heat 1

Heat 2

Heat 3

Heat 4

Heat 5

Heat 6

Heat 7

Heat 8

Quarterfinals

Heat 1

Heat 2

Heat 3

Heat 4

Semifinals

Heat 1

Heat 2

Finals

Small Finals

Big Finals

References

Snowboard cross, men's